Zachi Noy (born 8 July 1953) is an Israeli actor.

Early life
Noy was born in 1953 in Haifa, Israel. At a young age, Noy did stage work for the local Israeli theater "HaSadna" in Haifa. Later, he spent his military service in a military band.

Career
Noy gained much success after he played Yudale in the successful 1978 Israeli film Lemon Popsicle (Eskimo Limon) which became an Israeli cult film and was followed by a series of sequels. In the following decade Noy participated in all the sequels of "Lemon Popsicle" including a spin-off film called "Sababa".

Over the years Noy also played in a number of Israeli musicals for children such as "Peter Pan", "The Wizard of Oz" And "Sallah Shabati", as well as different Israeli entertainment stage shows and several children's television shows. Noy also participated in dubbing several animated movies into Hebrew – including Space Jam and The Swan Princess.
He will next appear in a lead role of the upcoming feature by Daryush Shokof, called Poison Works.

Personal life
Noy is married with two children. In May 2020, Noy's 91-year-old mother was reported missing. She was found dead two weeks later in Chalisa Neighborhood in Haifa which is further away from her regular environment.

Filmography

Movies 

1975: Ha-Diber Ha-11
1977: The Garden (Ha-Gan) – Rami
1977: 500,000 Black (Hamesh Ma'ot Elef Shahor)
1978: Lemon Popsicle (Eskimo Limon) – Yudale / Huey / Johnny
1978: Popcorn and Ice Cream – Jonny
1978: Little Shraga (Shraga Hakatan) – Zachi
1979: Going Steady (Yotzim Kavua) – Yudale / Huey / Johnny
1979: The Magician of Lublin – Bolek
1979: My Mother the General (Imi Hageneralit)
1979:  (Arabische Nächte) – Chauffeur
1980:  – Max
1981: Hot Bubblegum  (Shifshuf Naim) – Huey / Yudale
1981: Enter the Ninja – The Hook
1981:  – Emil
1982: Private Popsicle (Sapiches) – Yudale / Hughie
1983:  – Jakob
1983: Private Manoeuvres (Sababa) – Yudale / Kitbeg / Hughie
1984: The Ambassador – Ze'ev
1984: Baby Love (Roman Za'ir) – Yudale / Hughie
1985: Up Your Anchor (Harimu Ogen) – Yudale / Hughie
1987: Cannon Movie Tales: The Emperor's New Clothes – Hiccoughing Man
1987: Young Love (Ahava Tzeira) – Yudale / Hughie
1988: Starke Zeiten – Lilos Nachbar
1988: Summertime Blues (Blues Ba-Kayitz) – Hughie
1991: Onat Haduvdevanim
1990: The Day We Met (Neshika Bametzach) – Benzi Alman
1992: Liebesgrüße aus der Lederhose 7 – Kokosnüsse und Bananen – Fridolin
1993: Night Terrors – Chuck's Father
1994: Kafe V'Limon – Photographer
1994: Hakosem! – Arik / Aryeh, the Cowardly Lion
1994: Driks' Brother (Ha-Ach Shel Driks) – Rabi Weiss
1994: Ahare Hahagim – Langfus
1995: Yaldei Kenyon Hazahav
1995: Russian Roulette: Moscow 95
1999: Crossclub – The Legend of the Living Dead – Master
2001: The Party Goes On (Hahagiga Nimshehet) – Yehuda
2002: Hessed Shel Emet (Short) – Druk
2005: Days of Love (Yamim Shel Ahava) – Stalin
2007: The Little Traitor – Mr. Gihon
2008: Maftir – Jecky
2016: Project Genesis: Crossclub 2 – Meister
2016: Timeless – Regan
2016: EuroClub – Igor

TV series 
1990: Ein Schloß am Wörthersee – Harry Leim
1995: Ha-Mone Dofek
1997: Kachol Amok – Inspector
1998–2000: Ramat Aviv Gimmel – Lawyer Fifo
1999: Gisbert
2001: City Tower – Meni Shmilovich

External links
 Official Website
 

1953 births
Living people
Jewish Israeli male actors
Israeli male film actors
Israeli male stage actors
Israeli male musical theatre actors
Israeli male television actors
Israeli male voice actors
Male actors from Haifa
21st-century Israeli male actors
20th-century Israeli male actors